WAKG (103.3 MHz) is a commercial FM radio station licensed to Danville, Virginia, and serving Southside Virginia.  It broadcasts a country music radio format and is owned and operated by the Piedmont Broadcasting Corporation.  It is an affiliate of the Performance Racing Network, airing its car races on weekends.  The studios and offices are on Grove Street in Danville.

WAKG has an effective radiated power (ERP) of 100,000 watts, the maximum for most FM radio stations in the U.S.  The transmitter is on Tower Lane in Blairs, Virginia, near U.S. Route 29.  The coverage area stretches from the suburbs of Roanoke and Lynchburg to the north and Greensboro and Durham to the south.

History
The original call sign was WBTM-FM, the sister station to WBTM 1330 AM. They have always been owned by Piedmont Broadcasting. In WAKG's early years, the two stations simulcast a full service radio format, a mix of Middle of the Road music, local news and sports. They were affiliates of the ABC Entertainment Network.

In 1973, the stations separated their programming.  WBTM 1330 continued its full service format while the FM station became WAKG.  It had an automated beautiful music format.  WAKG played quarter hour sweeps of instrumental cover versions of popular songs, along with Broadway and Hollywood show tunes.

After a few years, WAKG flipped from beautiful music to automated Country music.  Over time, live DJs were added to the programming.  The station plays a mix of current country hits with some classic country titles.

References

External links
 103.3 WAKG Online
 

1968 establishments in Virginia
Country radio stations in the United States
Radio stations established in 1968
AKG